Amvrosios Papadopoulos (born 10 January 1989) is a professional Greek football player, currently playing for Agrotikos Asteras.

Club career
He started his professional career with Skoda Xanthi in 2007. In January 2010, he moved to Beta Ethniki side Thrasyvoulos on loan, but left after 4 months on 23 April 2010. He subsequently joined Makedonikos, Kozani and Delta Ethniki side Orfeas Eleftheroupoli. He moved to current club Doxa Drama on 16 January 2012, where he scored on his debut.

International career
Amvrosios was a former Greece U-17 international. He made his debut in a UEFA European U-17 Championship qualifier against Bosnia & Herzegovina.

References

External links
Onsports.gr profile 

1989 births
Living people
Doxa Drama F.C. players
Xanthi F.C. players
Super League Greece players
Greek footballers
Association football midfielders
Footballers from Kavala